Lecanites is a ceratitid genus assigned to the Danubitaceae, with an essentially smooth, evolote, discoidal shell and a goniatitic suture with many elements. It is the type and now only genus of the Lecanitidae.

Previously, according to the Treatise Part L,  Lecanites and Badiotites were included together in the Lecanitidae which then was part of the Clydonitaceae. Since then (Tozer 1981) Badiotites was reassigned to the new family Badiotitidae which is included in the Ceratitaceae and Lecanites and Lecanitidae put to the Danubitaceae.

Lecanites was named by Mojsisovics in 1882. It has been found in the middle and upper Triassic of California, Nevada, Idaho, China, and Italy.

References
Treatise on Invertebrate Paleontology, Part L, Ammonoidea. R. C. Moore (ed). Geological Society of America and Univ of Kansas press, 1957 
 Classification of E. T. Tozer 1981 E. T. Tozer. 1981. Triassic Ammonoidea: Classification, evolution and relationship with Permian and Jurassic Forms. The Ammonoidea: The evolution classification, mode of life and geological usefulness of a major fossil group 66-100

Danubitaceae
Triassic ammonites
Ceratitida genera
Ammonites of Europe
Ladinian first appearances
Carnian extinctions